The compound of four cubes or Bakos compound is a face-transitive polyhedron compound of four cubes with octahedral symmetry. It is the dual of the compound of four octahedra. Its surface area is 687/77 square lengths of the edge.

Its Cartesian coordinates are (±3, ±3, ±3) and the permutations of (±5, ±1, ±1).

Extension with fifth cube

The eight vertices on the 3-fold symmetry axes can be seen as the vertices of a fifth cube of the same size.
Referring to the images below, the four old cubes are called colored, and the new one black.
Each colored cube has two opposite vertices on a 3-fold symmetry axis, which are shared with the black cube. (In the picture both 3-fold vertices of the green cube are visible.) The remaining six vertices of each colored cube correspond to the faces of the black cube. This compound shares these properties with the compound of five cubes (related to the dodecahedron), into which it can be transformed by rotating the colored cubes on their 3-fold axes.

See also
Compound of three octahedra
Compound of five octahedra
Compound of ten octahedra
Compound of twenty octahedra
Compound of three cubes
Compound of five cubes
Compound of six cubes
Uniform polyhedron compound

References 

Polyhedral compounds